Kaarlo Lauri Torvald Malmberg (May 8, 1888 in Helsinki – March 14, 1948 in Helsinki) was a Finnish lieutenant general and son of Emil and Aino Malmberg. He was the Chief of Defence of the Finnish Defence Forces in 1925. General Malmberg served as the Commander-in-Chief of the Finnish Civil Guards (a voluntary paramilitary defence organization) from 1921 to 1944, when the organization was abolished as an "anti-Soviet" organization.  He also served as the Minister of Defence from 1924 to 1925. At the time there was a power struggle between German-trained and Russian-trained officers in the Defence Forces. His appointment was a good compromise, because on the other hand he represented the White Guards and the German-trained officer faction, but on the other hand his loyalty to the civilian Finnish government was unwavering.

Malmberg is recipient of the Latvian military Order of Lāčplēsis 2nd class and Lithuanian Riflemen's Star. Malmberg also received Estonian Order of the Cross of the Eagle 1st class and Latvian Order of the Three Stars Grand cross.  

His mother was Aino Malmberg and brother Erik Malmberg.

References

External links

The Finnish Defence Forces: Chiefs of Defence 

1888 births
1948 deaths
Ministers of Defence of Finland
Military personnel from Helsinki
People from Uusimaa Province (Grand Duchy of Finland)
Finnish lieutenant generals
German military personnel of World War I
People of the Finnish Civil War (White side)
Finnish military personnel of World War II
Finnish anti-communists
Recipients of the Order of Lāčplēsis, 2nd class